Grau is a German word meaning "gray" and a Catalan and Asturian word meaning "grade". It may refer to:

Places
 Le Grau-du-Roi, a commune in the Gard department in southern France
 Grado, Italy, Grau in the Friulian language
 Grado, Spain, Grau in the Asturian language

Other uses
 Grau (surname), a list of people with the name
 BAP Almirante Grau (CLM-81), a De Zeven Provinciën class cruiser in service with the Peruvian Navy
 Grau Käse, Tyrolean grey cheese
 Grau Records, a German record label specialising in Metal music
 GRAU, the Main Agency of Missiles and Artillery of the Ministry of Defense of the Russian Federation

See also 
 Grao (disambiguation)
 Graw (disambiguation)